Yupiltepeque is a municipality in the Jutiapa department of Guatemala. Yupiltepeque is a small town with about 13,000 inhabitants. The area is surrounded by a forest.

External links
 Details on Yupiltepeque (Spanish)

Municipalities of the Jutiapa Department